Escanaba in da Moonlight is a 2001 American comedy film written, directed, and starring Jeff Daniels. It is a comedy about hunting and hunting traditions and is set (and filmed) in the Escanaba, Michigan area.  The film uses Upper Peninsula language and slang. The movie is the film adaptation of the play of the same name, which premiered at Daniels' Purple Rose Theatre in Chelsea, Michigan.

Plot
Reuben Soady (Daniels) goes to the hunting camp cottage, otherwise known as deer camp, with his father Albert (played by Harve Presnell), brother Remnar (Joey Albright) and Jimmy "The Jimmer" Negamanee from Menominee (Wayne David Parker). If Reuben, now 43, doesn't manage to shoot a buck by the end of the season, he will become the oldest Soady in recorded history not to have achieved this task, a taboo that leads people in the community to believe he is jinxed.

Reuben breaks with tradition, taking advice from his Native American wife Wolf Moon Dance (Kimberly Norris Guerrero), who offers him spiritual remedies involving a drink made with moose testicles and scenting himself with porcupine urine to protect him from evil spirits and attract his prey to him.  After various unexplainable phenomena, they meet a DNR officer, Tom T. Treado (Randall Godwin), who claims to have literally seen God on the ridge.

At various times, Reuben, Jimmer, and ranger Tom all get possessed by spirits. Eventually, Reuben runs out into the cold wearing only his long underwear and a hat, and finds himself face-to-face with the ghost of his dead great-grandfather Alphonse Soady, who guides him to shooting a buck sent for him by the spirits.  Reuben returns triumphantly.

Cast
 Jeff Daniels as Reuben Soady
 Harve Presnell as Albert Soady
 Kimberly Norris Guerrero as Wolf Moon Dance Soady
 Joey Albright as Remnar Soady/Porcelain Bus Dancer
 Randall Godwin as Ranger Tom T. Treado
 Wayne David Parker as Jimmer Negamanee
 James Porterfield as Alphonse Soady
 Guy Sanville as Alvin Soady

Yooper/Michigan culture
A significant portion of the movie involves references to elements of "Yooper" (slang reference to residents of the U.P. or Upper Peninsula of Michigan) and broader Michigan/Upper Midwest culture.  Some references are obscure to viewers unfamiliar with this culture and might be considered in-jokes.

Some examples include:

  Pasties—the traditional foodstuff at the Soady deer camp, and food commonly associated with Yooper culture
  Leinenkugel's Beer—Remnar brings a case to deer camp, a reminder of Escanaba's proximity to Wisconsin, where Leinenkugel's is produced
  Mackinac Bridge—simply referred to as "the Bridge" throughout the film, the bridge that connects Michigan's peninsulas
  Mackinac Island Fudge—Albert refers to tourists from the Lower Peninsula of Michigan as "those fudgesuckers," a reference to the fudge made on Mackinac Island, a considerable draw for tourism from within the state
  The Superior State—used a few times to refer to the film's location; although a nickname for the state of Michigan as a whole, Superior is also the name of a once-proposed 51st state formed from the Upper Peninsula and, in some iterations, parts of Wisconsin
  US Highway 41—an old shield for this highway hangs on the wall in the Soady cabin; an important north–south highway in the western to central U.P.
  Pictured Rocks National Lakeshore—natural formation along lake shore mentioned briefly
  Euchre—a card game popular in the Midwest, possibly introduced to the United States by the early German settlers of Michigan
  M-35—a state highway starting at Menominee in the south, passing through Escanaba, and ending at US 41/M-28 between Marquette and Negaunee in the north

See also
Yooper dialect

References

External links
 
 
 

2001 films
2001 comedy films
2001 independent films
American comedy films
American independent films
2000s English-language films
American films based on plays
Films directed by Jeff Daniels
Films with screenplays by Jeff Daniels
Films set in 1989
Films about hunters
Films set in Michigan
Films shot in Michigan
Upper Peninsula of Michigan
2001 directorial debut films
Magic realism films
2000s American films